Camden County is a county located in the U.S. state of Missouri. As of the 2020 Census, the population was 42,745. Its county seat is Camdenton. The county was organized on January 29, 1841, as Kinderhook County and renamed Camden County in 1843 after Charles Pratt, 1st Earl Camden, Lord Chancellor of the United Kingdom and leader of the British Whig Party. Camden County is also the primary setting of the Netflix show Ozark.

Geography

Adjacent counties
Morgan County  (north)
Miller County  (northeast)
Pulaski County  (east)
Laclede County  (southeast)
Dallas County  (southwest)
Hickory County  (west)
Benton County  (northwest)

Major highways
 U.S. Route 54
 Route 5
 Route 7

Fire Towers
Fire Towers Include:
Branch Fire Tower
Climax Springs Fire Tower
Hurricane Deck Fire Tower

Demographics

As of the census of 2000, there were 37,051 people, 15,779 households, and 11,297 families residing in the county.  The population density was 57 people per square mile (22/km2).  There were 33,470 housing units at an average density of 51 per square mile (20/km2).  The racial makeup of the county was 97.68% White, 0.26% Black or African American, 0.49% Native American, 0.29% Asian, 0.04% Pacific Islander, 0.22% from other races, and 1.03% from two or more races. Approximately 0.93% of the population were Hispanic or Latino of any race.

There were 15,779 households, out of which 23.80% had children under the age of 18 living with them, 61.80% were married couples living together, 6.60% had a female householder with no husband present, and 28.40% were non-families. 23.30% of all households were made up of individuals, and 9.50% had someone living alone who was 65 years of age or older.  The average household size was 2.31 and the average family size was 2.68.

In the county, the population was spread out, with 20.30% under the age of 18, 6.10% from 18 to 24, 23.30% from 25 to 44, 31.40% from 45 to 64, and 19.00% who were 65 years of age or older.  The median age was 45 years. For every 100 females there were 100.00 males.  For every 100 females age 18 and over, there were 97.50 males.

The median income for a household in the county was $35,840, and the median income for a family was $40,695. Males had a median income of $28,020 versus $20,825 for females. The per capita income for the county was $20,197.  About 8.00% of families and 11.40% of the population were below the poverty line, including 17.00% of those under age 18 and 7.70% of those age 65 or over.

Religion
According to the Association of Religion Data Archives County Membership Report (2010), Camden County is part of the Bible Belt, with evangelical Protestantism being the most predominant religion. The most predominant denominations among residents in Camden County who adhere to a religion are Southern Baptists (33.09%), nondenominational evangelical groups (13.92%), and Roman Catholics (11.44%).

2020 Census

Education

Public schools
Camdenton R-III School District – Camdenton
Dogwood Elementary School (PK-02) 
Hawthorn Elementary School (03-04) 
Osage Beach Elementary School (PK-04) 
Hurricane Deck Elementary School (PK-04) 
Oak Ridge Intermediate School (05-06) 
Camdenton Middle School (07-08) 
Camdenton High School (09-12)
Climax Springs R-IV School District – Climax Springs
Climax Springs Elementary School (K-06) 
Climax Springs High School (07-12)
Macks Creek R-V School District – Macks Creek
Macks Creek Elementary School (PK-06) 
Macks Creek High School (07-12)
Stoutland R-II School District – Stoutland
Stoutland Elementary School (PK-06) 
Stoutland High School (07-12)

Private schools
Camden Christian School – Camdenton (PK-12) – Baptist

Public libraries
Camden County Library District

Politics

Local
The Republican Party predominantly controls politics at the local level in Camden County.

State

Camden County is split between two legislative districts that elect members of the Missouri House of Representatives, both of which are represented by Republicans.

District 123 — Suzie Pollock (R-Lebanon). Consists of the southern half of the county, including the communities of Camdenton, Linn Creek, Macks Creek, and Stoutland.

District 124 — Lisa Thomas (R-Lake Ozark). Consists of the northern half of the county, including the communities of Climax Springs, Lake Ozark, Osage Beach, Sunrise Beach, and Village of  Four Seasons.

All of Camden County is a part of Missouri's 16th District in the Missouri Senate and is currently represented by Justin Brown (R-Rolla).

Federal
Most of Camden County is included in Missouri's 3rd Congressional District and is currently represented by Blaine Luetkemeyer (R-St. Elizabeth) in the U.S. House of Representatives. Luetkemeyer was elected to a seventh term in 2020 over Democratic challenger Megan Rezabek.

Part of Camden County is included in Missouri's 4th Congressional District and is currently represented by Vicky Hartzler (R-Harrisonville) in the U.S. House of Representatives. Hartzler was elected to a sixth term in 2020 over Democratic challenger Lindsey Simmons.

Camden County, along with the rest of the state of Missouri, is represented in the U.S. Senate by Josh Hawley (R-Columbia) and Roy Blunt (R-Strafford).

Blunt was elected to a second term in 2016 over then-Missouri Secretary of State Jason Kander.

Political culture

Camden County has long been a Republican stronghold. The last Democrat to carry the county was Franklin D. Roosevelt in 1932, the only time a Democrat has won the county since Stephen Douglas in 1860. Underlining how Republican the county is, it rejected native son Harry Truman in 1944 when he was Roosevelt's running mate, and when he headed the ticket himself in 1948. Jimmy Carter is the only Democrat since Roosevelt to manage even 40 percent of the county's vote. 

Like most rural areas in western Missouri, voters in Camden County generally adhere to socially and culturally conservative principles which tend to influence their Republican leanings.

Missouri presidential preference primaries

2020
The 2020 presidential primaries for both the Democratic and Republican parties were held in Missouri on March 10. On the Democratic side, former Vice President Joe Biden (D-Delaware) both won statewide and carried Camden County by a wide margin. Biden went on to defeat President Donald Trump in the general election.

Incumbent President Donald Trump (R-Florida) faced a primary challenge from former Massachusetts Governor Bill Weld, but won both Camden County and statewide by overwhelming margins.

2016
The 2016 presidential primaries for both the Republican and Democratic parties were held in Missouri on March 15. Businessman Donald Trump (R-New York) narrowly won the state overall, but carried a majority of the vote in Camden County. He went on to win the presidency.

On the Democratic side, former Secretary of State Hillary Clinton (D-New York) narrowly won statewide, but Senator Bernie Sanders (I-Vermont) carried Camden County by a small margin.

2012
The 2012 Missouri Republican Presidential Primary's results were nonbinding on the state's national convention delegates. Voters in Camden County supported former U.S. Senator Rick Santorum (R-Pennsylvania), who finished first in the state at large, but eventually lost the nomination to former Governor Mitt Romney (R-Massachusetts). Delegates to the congressional district and state conventions were chosen at a county caucus, which selected a delegation favoring Santorum. Incumbent President Barack Obama easily won the Missouri Democratic Primary and renomination. He defeated Romney in the general election.

2008
In 2008, the Missouri Republican Presidential Primary was closely contested, with Senator John McCain (R-Arizona) prevailing and eventually winning the nomination.

Then-Senator Hillary Clinton (D-New York) received more votes than any candidate from either party in Camden County during the 2008 presidential primary. Despite initial reports that Clinton had won Missouri, Barack Obama (D-Illinois), also a Senator at the time, narrowly defeated her statewide and later became that year's Democratic nominee, going on to win the presidency.

Communities

Cities
Camdenton (county seat)
Lake Ozark (mostly in Miller County)
Linn Creek
Osage Beach (largest city, also in Miller County)
Richland (mostly in Pulaski County and a small part in Laclede County)

Villages
Friedenswald
Stoutland
Sunrise Beach
Village of Four Seasons

Census-designated places
Climax Springs
Macks Creek
Montreal

Other unincorporated places

 Bannister
 Barnumton
 Branch
 Damsel
 Decaturville
 Green Bay Terrace
 Hugo
 Hurricane Deck
 Neongwah
 Passover
 Purvis
 Roach
 Sagrada
 Toronto
 Wet Glaize

Notable people
 Joseph W. McClurg, Governor of Missouri (1869-1871) and U.S. Representative from Missouri (1863-1868)

See also
National Register of Historic Places listings in Camden County, Missouri

References

Further reading
 History of Laclede, Camden, Dallas, Webster, Wright, Texas, Pulaski, Phelps, and Dent counties, Missouri (1889) full text

External links
 Digitized 1930 Plat Book of Camden County  from University of Missouri Division of Special Collections, Archives, and Rare Books
 Camden County Historical Society

 
Missouri counties
1841 establishments in Missouri
Populated places established in 1841